This is a list of venues used for professional baseball in Jersey City, New Jersey. It is a compilation of the information contained in the references listed.

Grand Street Grounds
Home of:
Jersey City Jerseys Eastern League (mid-1885 – 1886)
Jersey City Skeeters International League (1887)
Location: Grand Street
Currently: unknown

Oakland Park
Home of:
Jersey City Skeeters Central League (1888)
Jersey City Jerseys Atlantic Association (1889 - mid-1890)
New York Giants NL (1889 - 2 games)
Location: Oakland Avenue (northwest); Hoboken Avenue (southwest - grandstand location); Bonner (now Baldwin) Avenue (southeast);  Fleet Street (northeast).
Currently: Residential and commercial buildings

Johnston Street Grounds
Home of: Jersey City Atlantic League (1900)
Location: Johnston Street
Currently: unknown

West Side Park (I) aka Skeeters Park
Home of:
Jersey City Skeeters  Eastern League  (1902–1911) / International League (1912–1915)
Jersey City Skeeters  IL  (1918 – about 1929)
Location: West Side Avenue (east), Belmont Avenue (south), Marcy Avenue (west), Duncan Avenue (north)
Formerly: Jersey City Golf Club
Currently: Lincoln Park (developed and renamed in 1930)

West Side Park (II) aka Skeeters Park
Home of: Jersey City Skeeters  IL  (about 1930 – 1933)
Location: West Side Avenue (northwest, first base); Bay View Avenue (northeast, third base)
Currently: University buildings

Roosevelt Stadium
Home of:
Jersey City Giants IL (1937–1950)
Brooklyn Dodgers NL (1956–1957, 15 games)
Jersey City Reds / Jerseys IL (1960–1961)
Jersey City Indians / Jersey City A's EL (1977–1978)
Location: Droyer's Point (north, third base); State Highway 440 / Danforth Avenue (east, center field); Newark Bay (south and west, right field and home plate)
Currently: Residential and commercial development

See also
Lists of baseball parks

References

Peter Filichia, Professional Baseball Franchises, Facts on File, 1993.

External links
Retrosheet 1889 game log for the Giants
Baseball in Jersey City
Jersey City Skeeters

Jersey City
Jersey City
Jersey City baseball
Jersey City
Jersey City
Jersey City, New Jersey
New Jersey sports-related lists